The 1939 Connecticut Huskies football team represented the University of Connecticut in the 1939 college football season.  The Huskies were led by sixth-year head coach J. Orlean Christian and completed the season with a record of 5–3.

Schedule

References

Connecticut
UConn Huskies football seasons
Connecticut Huskies football